The maiden rocksnail, scientific name †Leptoxis formosa, was a species of freshwater snail with a gill and an operculum, an aquatic gastropod mollusk in the family Pleuroceridae.

This species was endemic to the United States. It is now extinct.

References

Lea, I. (1860). Descriptions of fourteen new species of Schizostomae, Anculosae and Lithasiae. Proceedings of the Academy of Natural Sciences of Philadelphia. 12: 186-188 [after 22 May 1860]., available online at https://www.biodiversitylibrary.org/page/26297333

Leptoxis
Extinct gastropods
Gastropods described in 1860
Taxonomy articles created by Polbot
Taxa named by Isaac Lea